Norman Leslie may refer to:
Norman Leslie (soldier) (died 1554), Scottish noble and soldier
Norman Leslie, 19th Earl of Rothes (1877–1927), Scottish peer and soldier
Norman Leslie of the Leslie baronets

See also
Leslie Norman (disambiguation)